The Pear People is a series of 3D animated cartoons by John Kay.

Cartoons

Pear People in Car Race
This is one of the earliest 3D animated cartoons, made in 1992, by John Kay using a basic computer program with no interface. It features two Pear characters, a good one and a bad one, competing in a car race. Length 5:30 minutes.

It was first released in the United Kingdom on the 10th of May, 1993.

Pear People in Prisoner
The second cartoon (1993) by John Kay finds our bad pear in prison and tries various ways to escape. Of course, he is always unsuccessful in a disastrous way. Length 6:30 minutes.

External links

Computer animation